Pitt Clubs were private members clubs formed in Great Britain in the 18th and 19th century to memorialise William Pitt the Younger (1759–1806). Although the London Pitt Club was formed in 1793, it was only after the death of Pitt that more "country" Pitt clubs were established outside London.

London Pitt Club
The London Pitt Club was formed in 1793 by Nathaniel Atcheson with a view to counteract the radical ideas of the French Revolution. Originally the club met on the birthdays of George III and his Queen Charlotte of Mecklenburg-Strelitz Following Pitt's resignation in 1801 they also celebrated Pitt's birthday on 28 May. Following his death, the London club was relaunched in 1808.

Other Pitt Clubs
Other Pitt Clubs were formed in at least 45 towns.
 Altrincham
 Birmingham
 Blackburn
 Blackburn Hundred.
 Bolton.
 Bristol.
 Carlisle
 Colchester
 Derby
 Devon and Exeter
 Doncaster
 Dudley (1813)
 Dundee
 Glasgow
 Halifax
 Hampshire
 Hereford
 Hull
 Lancaster
 Leeds
 Leicester
 Liverpool
 Manchester
 Menai
 Northumberland and Newcastleupon-Tyne
 Northwich 1814 (re-founded in 1932 as the Mid-Cheshire Pitt Club, re-named Cheshire Pitt Club in 1998). 
 Norwich
 Nottingham
 Plymouth
 Reading and Berkshire
 Rochdale
 Saddleworth
 Scarborough
 Scotland
 Sheffield (1810)
 North and South Shields
 Staffordshire and Newcastleunder-Lyme
 Stirling
 Suffolk (1821)
 Sunderland
 Taunton and Somersetshire
 Wales
 Warrington
 Wolverhampton
 York

University Pitt Club, Cambridge
The University Pitt Club, founded in Cambridge in 1835 soon became a purely social club.

References

Dining clubs
1793 establishments in England
William Pitt the Younger